Rhyacionia pinicolana is a moth of the family Tortricidae. It is found from northern and central Europe to eastern Russia, China (Beijing, Tianjin, Hebei, Shanxi, Inner Mongolia, Liaoning, Jilin, Heilongjiang, Fujian, Jiangxi, Henan, Guizhou, Shaanxi, Ningxia), Japan and Korea.

The wingspan is 16–23 mm. Adults are on wing from mid July to the end of August.

The larvae feed on Pinus sylvestris, Pinus halepensis and Pinus nigra var. nigra. In Pinus sylvestris, the larvae feed in the shoots, causing a resinous exudation and distortion, sometimes causing damage to the leading shoot.

References

External links
Eurasian Tortricidae

Eucosmini
Moths described in 1850
Moths of Europe
Insects of Turkey